The 1955 FA Cup final was the 74th final of the FA Cup. It took place on 7 May 1955 at Wembley Stadium and was contested between Newcastle United and Manchester City.

Newcastle won the match 3–1, thus winning the FA Cup for the third time in five years and the sixth time in all. Jackie Milburn scored Newcastle's first goal after 45 seconds (a record for a Wembley final that would stand until 1997), before Bobby Johnstone equalised for City just before half-time. Bobby Mitchell restored Newcastle's lead in the 52nd minute, and George Hannah extended it seven minutes later.

The match was virtually decided in the 17th minute when City fullback Jimmy Meadows attempted a tackle on Mitchell, only to sustain a serious leg injury which forced him to be stretchered off five minutes later (and also forced him to retire from playing). As substitutes were not allowed in English football at the time, City had to play the rest of the match with ten players.

As of 2022, this remains Newcastle's last FA Cup win and major domestic honour, though they have appeared in three finals since.

Match details

External links
FA Cup Final lineups

FA Cup Finals
FA Cup Final
FA Cup Final 1955
FA Cup Final 1955
FA Cup Final
FA Cup Final